"Lay Down Your Arms" is a rock song which Charlotte Caffey, Ralph Schuckett, and Ellen Shipley wrote and composed, and which Shipley produced, for The Graces' album Perfect View (1989). Caffey was lead vocalist, and the song was released as the band's debut single. It charted at #56 in the Billboard charts.

Music video
Features the band performing the song in a forest-like setting interspersed with closeup shots of the band members.

Charts

Belinda Carlisle cover

The song was covered by American singer-songwriter Belinda Carlisle, who, like her friend Caffey, was an alumna of The Go-Go's. It was the second song Carlisle released from her fifth studio album, Real, which she released in 1993. Carlisle's version, which Schuckett produced, was the more successful of the two versions, charting at number 27 on the UK Singles Chart. The CD single included three additional tracks: "Tell Me", "Wrap My Arms", and "Here Comes My Baby"; the last two were 8-track demos.

Critical reception
Alan Jones from Music Week gave Carlisle's version of the song three out of five, writing, "This undistinguished single clatters along without providing any moments of great signficance. A hit (all her Virgin singles are) but not one of Carlisle's biggest or best."

Music video
The accompanying music video for the Carlisle cover was directed by Neil Abramson.

Track listing
 4 track CD single
 "Lay Down Your Arms"
 "Tell Me"
 "Wrap My Arms Around You" (8-track demo)
 "Here Comes My Baby" (8-track demo)

Charts

References

1989 singles
1993 singles
Belinda Carlisle songs
Songs written by Charlotte Caffey
Songs written by Ellen Shipley
Songs written by Ralph Schuckett
Virgin Records singles
1989 songs
A&M Records singles